Boveiry or Buvairi or Buyeri may refer to:
 Boveyri, Bushehr
 Boveyri, alternate name of Bowheyri, Bushehr Province
 Buyeri, Kohgiluyeh and Boyer-Ahmad